Gala - An Evening With Sarah Brightman was a 2016-17 concert tour by British soprano singer Sarah Brightman with eleven shows in Japan, three in South Korea and three in Mexico.

The Gala Tour features a classical crossover repertoire. Mario Frangoulis share duets like "The Phantom of the Opera," "Canto De La Terra" and "Carpe Diem," recorded with Frangoulis on Brightman's "A Winter Symphony" album, which he also features as a bonus track on "Tales of Christmas," his first holiday album released in 2015. Joining the two singers are pianist Di Wu, counter tenor Narcis Iustin Ianău, and maestro Paul Bateman, the show is directed by Anthony Van Laast.

For Japan concerts, Brightman sang the song titled "Stand Alone", from the drama Saka no ue no kumo (坂の上の雲; lit. Clouds over the hills) composed by Joe Hisaishi and performed by the NHK Symphony Orchestra.

Set list
ACT I
"Sunset Boulevard Overture"
"Harem" 
"Stand Alone"  
"Nella Fantasia"  
"Anytime Anywhere"
"Dust in the Wind"
"Carpe Diem" 
"It's a Beautiful Day"
"La Luna"
"Rachmaninov #23"  
"A Whiter Shade of Pale"
"Scarborough Fair" 
"Buongiorno Principessa" 
"Vincero Perdero"  
"Canto Della Terra" 
"Nessun Dorma"
ACT II
"Spellbound Concerto" 
"Figlio Perduto"
"Stranger in Paradise"
"There for Me" 
"Pie Jesu"  
"Caruso"  
"The Phantom of The Opera" 
"Time to Say Goodbye"
Encore
"Warsaw Concerto" 
"Running"
"Ave María"

Concert style 

The concert style is very classical as Frangoulis stated "I particularly like the Gala Tour concept because it brings us both back to our roots in the theatre and classical music" Brightman said in an interview "The concert has a hollywood feel about it, I'm doing beautiful classical pieces and crossover pieces... In all it will be a very rich concert, very glamorous looking and will take us back in time".

She uses different gowns, Park Jin-han from Korea Times wrote: "As the sound of wind meets the audience and the stage gleams with an eerie red light, Sarah Brightman, one of the world's most popular English classical crossover singers, appears on stage in a glittering silver dress and sings the theme song of the musical The Phantom of the Opera. 

In Antalya's concert an orchestra of 50 have accompanied her on the stage. Sarah opened her concert with "Harem" which gave its name to her 7th album that hit the shelves in 2003, singing famous arias and crossover hits during the concert but also she invited Erkan Aki to sing with her some duets.

Tour dates

Critical reception 
The Gala show received positive reviews from critics. Park Jin-han from Korea Times wrote: "Her voice had such power, striking hard and strong at once and yet soft and tender as well.". Antalya Expo's official website wrote: "Singing famous opera and classical music pieces during the concert, British soprano made the audience impressed by her strong voice and style."

References 

Sarah Brightman concert tours
2016 concert tours